This is a list of seasons by the Rain or Shine Elasto Painters of the Philippine Basketball Association.

Two-conference era
*one-game playoffs**team had twice-to-beat advantage

Three-conference era
*one-game playoffs**team had the twice-to-beat advantage

End-of-season records

Cumulative records